Shq1p is a protein involved in the rRNA processing pathway.  It was discovered by Pok Yang in the Chanfreau laboratory at UCLA.  Depletion of Shq1p has led to decreased level of various H/ACA box snoRNAs (H/ACA box snoRNAs are responsible for pseuduridylation of pre-rRNA) and certain pre-rRNA intermediates.

Background 

During the synthesis of eukaryotic ribosomes, four mature ribosomal RNAs (the 5S, 5.8S, 18S, and 25S) must be synthesized.  Three of these rRNAs (5.8S, 18S, and 25S) come from a single pre-rRNA known as the 35S.  Although many of the intermediates in this rRNA processing pathway have been identified in the last thirty years, there are still a number of proteins involved in this process whose specific function is unknown.

Function 

Shq1, a protein thought to play a role in the stabilization and/or production of box H/ACA snoRNA, is still uncharacterized.  It has been proposed that Shq1, along with Naf1p, is involved in the initial steps of the biogenesis of H/ACA box snoRNPs (box H/ACA snoRNAs form complexes with proteins, thereby forming snoRNPs) because of its association with certain snoRNP proteins during the snoRNP’s maturation, while showing very little association with the mature snoRNP complex.  Despite the known involvement of Shq1 in H/ACA box snoRNP's production, the exact function of this protein in the overall rRNA processing pathway is still unknown.

See also
rRNA
snoRNA
Ribosomes
Eukaryotic translation
Proteins

References

External links
Chanfreau laboratory
Shq1 gene in yeast genome

Molecular biology
Proteins
RNA